There are many famous theaters in New York, most notably the Broadway theatres in New York City.

In Albany
The Egg Center for the Performing Arts
In Buffalo
Shea's Performing Arts Center
In New York City
African Grove
Broadway theaters
Chelsea Theater Center, founded in 1965 by Robert Kalfin, later closed
The Flea Theater  
Hippodrome Theatre (1905–1939)
New York City Center
New York Theatre Workshop
Theater for the New City
Theatre on Nassau Street (1732–1753)
The Town Hall
In Rochester
Eastman Theatre
Geva Theatre Center
In Syracuse
John D. Archbold Theatre
In Utica
Stanley Theater
In West Point:
The Eisenhower Hall Theatre

List
New York
Theaters